Cymindis rufipes is a species of ground beetle in the subfamily Harpalinae. It was described by Gebler in 1925.

References

rufipes
Beetles described in 1925